The Juno Award for Indigenous Music Album of the Year is an annual award presented by the Canadian Academy of Recording Arts and Sciences for the best album by an Indigenous Canadian artist or band. It was formerly known as Best Music of Aboriginal Canada Recording (1994–2002), Aboriginal Recording of the Year (2003–2009), and Aboriginal Album of the Year (2010–2016). Indigenous artists are not excluded from consideration in other genre or general interest categories; in fact, some indigenous musicians, most notably The Halluci Nation, have actively chosen not to submit their music in the indigenous category at all, instead pursuing nomination only in the more general categories.

The award faced controversy in its inaugural year, after nominee Sazacha Red Sky was accused of cultural appropriation. According to the surviving children of Chief Dan George, the writer of the song she had been nominated for, she was not personally a member of the Tsleil-Waututh First Nation and according to the George family did not have the right to record it under their cultural traditions. George's son Leonard sought a legal injunction to prevent the award from being presented at the Juno Awards ceremony at all, and a final compromise revising Red Sky's nomination to reflect the album instead of the song was announced on the morning of the ceremony.

More recently, some indigenous artists have called for the category to be discontinued, on the grounds that a dedicated indigenous category "ghettoizes" their music as a niche interest not relevant to non-indigenous music fans, while others have defended it as a platform for increasing the visibility of indigenous music, arguing that even though indigenous artists are eligible in all Juno award categories, relatively few indigenous artists actually receive such nominations due to their lack of mainstream prominence and the much wider range of competition for nomination slots.

In late 2019, the Junos announced plans to rename the category as Indigenous Artist or Group of the Year for the 2020 ceremony. While the category would still honour particular albums, the organization said the decision was made to address questions they received from Indigenous artists "who believe they're submitting to a category meant to shine a spotlight on the accomplishments of Indigenous people." The Junos suggested the change would likely "eliminate a lot of the confusion and put us in a better position to explain the need for the category, when challenged."

At the Juno Awards of 2021, it was announced further changes were being made for the Juno Awards of 2022, splitting the category into two new categories for Contemporary Indigenous Artist of the Year and Traditional Indigenous Artist of the Year.

Winners

Best Music of Aboriginal Canada Recording (1994–2002)

Aboriginal Recording of the Year (2003–2009)

Aboriginal Album of the Year (2010–2016)

Indigenous Music Album of the Year (2017–2021)

See also

Aboriginal music of Canada
Aboriginal Canadian personalities

References

Indigenous
Indigenous Canadian music awards
Album awards